The American Spinning Company Mill No. 2 is a historic mill complex at 300 Hammett Street, in a pocket of unincorporated Greenville County, South Carolina surrounded on three sides by the city of Greenville.  It is a five-story brick building, to which a number of warehouse buildings and other additions were made.  It was built in 1901-02, as part of a major expansion to the American Spinning Company's Mill No. 1, which originally stood just south of Hammett Street.  It was built by Oscar Sampson, a Boston textile manufacturer to a design by the industrial design firm Lockwood and Greene, and is one of thirteen early 20th-century mills surviving in the Greenville area.  It was listed on the National Register of Historic Places in 2016.  Its major tenant now is the Victor Mill Company, a furniture maker.

See also
 National Register of Historic Places listings in Greenville County, South Carolina
 Cone Mills Corporation

References

External links
Victor Mill web site

Buildings and structures in Greenville County, South Carolina
National Register of Historic Places in Greenville County, South Carolina
Industrial buildings and structures on the National Register of Historic Places in South Carolina
Textile mills in South Carolina
Cotton mills in the United States